Uthamadani is a village in the Kumbakonam taluk of Thanjavur district, Tamil Nadu, India.

Demographics 

In the 2001 census, Uthamadani had a total population of 610 with 313 males and 297 females. The sex ratio was 949. The literacy rate was 45.37%.

References 

 

Villages in Thanjavur district